This is a list of hospitals in Niger. While the World Bank classified 40 hospitals in Niger in 2001, most are small clinics. There were on 296 Physicians in a country of over 13 million people in 2004. Some of the larger hospitals are listed below.

Niamey Capitol District

Niamey

National Hospital of Niamey 
Created in 1922 by the colonial administration, it received the title of National Hospital of Niamey (Hopital National de Niamey or HNN) in 1962. It is a modern and government operated hospital in the capital of Niger. It is the largest hospital in the country that provides a full range of medical and surgical services to patients in Niamey and the rest of the country. Along with the Lamorde National Hospital, it is the leading hospital in the country. Other regional hospitals refer cases to the National Hospital of Niamey and the Lamorde National Hospital when in need. It is equipped with radiology equipment and provides psychiatry, neurosurgery and cardiology services.

Maradi Region

Dosso Region

Diffa Region

Tillabéri Region

Tahoua Region

Agadez Region

Zinder Region

See also
Health in Niger
List of companies based in Niger

References

VILLAGES WITH CLINICS/HOSPITALS: REPUBLIC OF NIGER. PRELIMINARY ATLAS OF POVERTY/VULNERABILITY. Prepared for The World Bank Technical Department, Africa Region (2001)
Niger: sign-post.org. Todd Ulmer, MD (June 2008) Surgical Implant Generation Network, Richland, WA, US
Participating Hospitals: BlueCard Worldwide (2002).

 List
Niger
Niger
Hospitals